Ivica Puljak (born 27 August 1969) is a Croatian politician, particle physicist and professor at University of Split's FESB division. He is currently serving as mayor of Split since 2022 and is the president of the Centre political party.

Life

Early life and education 
Puljak was born in 1969 in Split, SR Croatia, Yugoslavia. His parents are from the Dalmatian Hinterland with his father, Zdravko, being from Zagvozd and mother, Jaka, from Drniš. Growing up in Split and attending primary and high school in his hometown, he dreamed of becoming a footballer for the local club, Hajduk.

Personal life 
Puljak is married to Marijana and they have 2 daughters and one son together.

Scientific career 
Puljak was one of several physicts who participated in the search for Higgs boson.

Political career 
Puljak ran for and won the 2021 Split mayoral elections.
After about one year, a special election was summoned due to the dissolution of the city council, where Puljak had lost his majority. Adding to the commotion, his deputy mayor, Bojan Ivošević, was charged with threatening a journalist. On April 8, Mayor Puljak and both his deputies resigned. Ivica Puljak won the special election becoming the first mayor of Split to win more than one election and his party Centre won 15 seats out of 31 in the city council.

See also 
 List of mayors of Split

References 

Particle physicists
1969 births
Croatian politicians
Academic staff of the University of Split
Living people
Mayors of Split, Croatia